Judith Revel (born 1966) is a French philosopher and translator.

Biography
Daughter of the historian and former president of the EHESS Jacques Revel, former student of the Ecole Normale Supérieure de Fontenay-Saint-Cloud, Judith Revel is a specialist in contemporary French and Italian thoughts.

After a first doctorate of philosophy obtained in Italy, she supported in France a doctoral thesis in philosophy under the direction of Marcel Gauchet (EHESS, 2005). She was a lecturer at the Université Paris 1 Panthéon-Sorbonne and is now Professor of Contemporary Philosophy at the University Paris-Nanterre since 2014. She is a member of the laboratory Sophiapol.

She is a member of the Michel Foucault Center, the scientific council of IMEC, the scientific council of the International College of Philosophy. She lives with her partner Antonio Negri, the Italian philosopher.

Work
Her research started from the thought of Michel Foucault, to whom she has devoted a dictionary, several books and many articles, especially around two themes - the relationship between philosophy of language and literature (developed by Foucault in the 1960s), Foucault's opposition to idealism, and the transition from biopolitics to subjectivation (developed by Foucault between the late 1970s and the early 1980s). She is linked to the work of the American philosopher Arnold Davidson, with whom she has in common an attempt to update the ethico-political Foucaldian themes.

After the 2005 French riots, she wrote a book about the so-called "banlieues" (suburbs in French) criticizing both the clichés that surrounds its inhabitants and the growth of racism in the French society. She analysed the refusal to give any political value to what was happening in the suburbs by deconstructing racist implicit images of public speeches (the roots of it might be the conviction that the one who does not speak the language of political representation is necessarily aphasic, childish or even animal).

Since the beginning of 2010, she has been working more generally on the philosophy of history, and especially the way in which a certain practice of philosophy has problematized both its own historical situation and the possibility of intervening in the present. In this context, she develops a work on the philosophical use of archives, especially through teachings and seminars at the EHESS. More generally, she studied the different representations of history in French thought since the 1950s.

It also extends its investigation of some Italian readings of French poststructuralism (Italian opera and post-opera, thoughts of Giorgio Agamben and Roberto Esposito). Finally, she develops a series of theses on the political theorizations before and after 1968 and on the necessary recasting of the political concepts of modernity, in the silage of Italian operaism and more particularly the analyzes of the philosopher Toni Negri who is also her husband. She works in particular on the notion of "common" as an alternative to the public / private dichotomy, and on a political ontology of the present building bridges between Maurice Merleau-Ponty and Michel Foucault.

Bibliography

Books
 Michel Foucault, expériences de la pensée , Bordas 2005 
 Qui a peur de la banlieue? , Bayard jeunesse 2008 
 Dictionnaire Foucault , Ellipses 2007  Foucault, une pensée du discontinu , Fayard/Mille et une nuits 2010 
 Dictionnaire politique à l'usage des gouvernés , Bayard, 2012.
 Un malentendu philosophique. Foucault, Derrida et l'affaire Descartes , Bayard Culture 2015 .
 Foucault avec Merleau-Ponty. Ontologie politique, présentisme et histoire'' , Vrin, 2015.

References

External links
 The Foucaldian Library 
 Critical Theory Workshop
Columbia University page on Judith Revel

1966 births
21st-century French philosophers
Continental philosophers
Living people
Date of birth missing (living people)